The Protectorate General to Pacify the West (Anxi Grand Protectorate), initially the Protectorate to Pacify the West (Anxi Protectorate), was a protectorate (640 – ) established by the Chinese Tang dynasty in 640 to control the Tarim Basin. The head office was first established at the prefecture of Xi, now known as Turpan, but was later shifted to Qiuci (Kucha) and situated there for most of the period.

The Four Garrisons of Anxi in Kucha, Khotan, Kashgar, and Karashahr were installed between 648 and 658 as garrisons under the western protectorate. In 659, Sogdia, Ferghana, Tashkent, Bukhara, Samarkand, Balkh, Herat, Kashmir, the Pamirs, Tokharistan, and Kabul all submitted to the protectorate under Emperor Gaozong of Tang.

After the An Lushan Rebellion (755–763) was suppressed, the office of Protector General was given to Guo Xin, who defended the area and the four garrisons even after communication had been cut off from Chang'an by the Tibetan Empire. The last five years of the protectorate are regarded as an uncertain period in its history, but most sources agree that the last vestiges of the protectorate and its garrisons were defeated by Tibetan forces by the year 790, ending nearly 150 years of Tang influence in Central Asia.

History

7th century 

 

The Western Regions during the Tang era were known as Qixi (磧西). Qi refers to the Gobi Desert while Xi refers to the west. In 632 the oasis kingdoms of Khotan (Yutian) and Shule (Kashgar) submitted to the Tang dynasty as vassals. In 635 Yarkand (Shache) submitted to the Tang dynasty.

On 19 September 640 Hou Junji of Tang conquered Gaochang and set up Xi Prefecture (西州) in its place. Xi Prefecture became the seat of the Anxi Protectorate on 11 October. Qiao Shiwang became the first protector general of the Anxi and served from 640 to 642. Guo Xiaoke received the next post and served from 640 to 648. By 644 Karasahr was also conquered, and was known to the Chinese as Yanqi. Aksu (Gumo) was garrisoned by Tang troops.

In 648, the Tang conquered Kucha, known to the Chinese as Qiuci, and made it the new seat of Anxi under the governance of Chai Zhewei from 649 to 651. By 650 the entire Western Region had submitted to Tang authority. In 651 the seat was moved back to Xi Prefecture where it remained under the governance of Qu Zhizhan from 651 to 658. In 656 the Tibetan Empire attacked Lesser Bolü in Gilgit southwest of the protectorate.

In 658 the seat was moved back to Qiuci after Su Dingfang defeated the Western Turkic Khaganate. Its title was changed to "Grand Protectorate" and granted governorship of former Western Turkic territories, which were further separated into the Mengchi and Kunling protectorates. In 660 the Tibetan Empire and their Turkic allies attacked Shule. The Tibetan Empire also attacked Wakhan to the protectorate's southwest. When the Tang general boasted of the size of his army, Gar Tongtsen Yulsung's son responded in the following manner:

In 663 the Tibetan Empire conquered Tuyuhun southeast of the protectorate. They also attacked Yutian but were repelled. In 665 the Tibetan Empire and Turkic allies attacked Yutian. The conflict between the Tang and Tibetans was the primary context under which the story of a Khotanese princess striving to rescue Khotan from destruction was formulated. One passage of the story in prayer form reads: 

In 670 the Tibetan Empire routed a Tang army at the Battle of Dafei River and attacked Gumo as well as captured Qiuci. The protectorate's seat was moved to Suyab, known as Suiye to the Chinese, in modern Kyrgyzstan. In 673 the Tang consolidated control over the Wuduolu Turks living in the area that came to be known as Dzungaria. The Tang also captured Qiuci and established control over the Western Regions in the same year. In 677 the Tibetan Empire captured Qiuci. In the same year Ashina Duzhi, previously a Tang general tasked with controlling the Wuduolu Turks, rebelled and declared himself Onoq Khagan, ruler of all Turks. In 679 the Tang general, Pei Xingjian, defeated Ashina Duzhi as well as the Tibetans and established control over the Western Regions.

In 686 Tang troops withdrew from the Four Garrisons after elements within the court argued for the decrease of military expenditures. In 687 the Tibetan Empire established control over the Western Regions. In 690 the Tibetan Empire defeated a Tang army at Issyk-Kul

In 692 Tang troops under Wang Xiaojie pacified the Western Regions and established the Anxi Protectorate at Qiuci, where it would remain until the protectorate's demise around 790. The importance of the Western Regions was well understood by the Tang court at this point. Its strategic significance is summarized by Cui Rong, an Imperial Diarist of the court:

In 694 the Tibetan Empire attacked the Stone City (Charklik).

8th century

In 702 Wu Zetian set up the Beiting Protectorate in Ting Prefecture (Jimsar County) and granted it governorship over Yi Prefecture (Hami) and Xi Prefecture. In 708 the Turgesh attacked Qiuci. In 710 the Tibetan Empire conquered Lesser Bolü.

Arab sources claim Qutayba ibn Muslim briefly took Kashgar from China and withdrew after an agreement but modern historians entirely dismiss this claim.

In 715 the Tibetan Empire attacked Fergana, a Tang vassal. In 717 the Tibetan Empire attacked Gumo and the Stone City.

The Arab Umayyad Caliphate in 715 AD deposed Ikhshid, the king the Fergana Valley, and installed a new king Alutar on the throne. The deposed king fled to Kucha (seat of Anxi Protectorate) and sought Chinese intervention. The Chinese sent 10,000 troops under Zhang Xiaosong to Ferghana. He defeated Alutar and the Arab occupation force at Namangan and reinstalled Ikhshid on the throne.

General Tang Jiahui led the Chinese to defeat the following Arab-Tibetan attack in the Battle of Aksu (717). The attack on Aksu was joined by Turgesh Khan Suluk. Both Uch Turfan and Aksu were attacked by the Turgesh, Arab, and Tibetan force on 15 August 717. Qarluqs serving under Chinese command, under Arsila Xian, a Western Turkic Qaghan serving under the Chinese Assistant Grand Protector General Tang Jiahui defeated the attack. Al-Yashkuri, the Arab commander and his army fled to Tashkent after they were defeated.

In 719 the Turgesh captured Suiye. In 720 the Tibetan Empire seized the Stone City. In the same year Tang bestowed titles upon the kings of Khuttal, Chitral, and Oddiyana In 722 Tang restored the king of Lesser Bolü to his throne. In 725 the king of Khotan (Yutian) rebelled but was immediately replaced with a Tang puppet by protectorate forces.

In 726 the Turgesh attempted to engage in horse trade at Qiuci without prior authorization. The Turgesh Khagan Suluk used his marital relation with Princess Jiaohe to issue a decree ordering the Protector-General to engage in trade. However Princess Jiaohe was actually the daughter of Ashina Huaidao, and the Protector-General retorted: "How can an Ashina woman proclaim a decree to me, a military commissioner?!" In response Suluk attacked Qiuci.

In 727 and 728 the Tibetan Empire attacked Qiuci. In 737 the Tibetan Empire conquered Lesser Bolü. In 741 the Tibetan Empire sacked the Stone City. In 745 the Tang general Huangfu Weiming attacked the Stone City but suffered a major defeat. According to Huangfu, the Stone City was one of the most heavily defended bastions of the Tibetan Empire:
 

In 747 the Tang general Gao Xianzhi captured Lesser Bolü. In 748 the Tang recaptured Suiye and destroyed it. In 749 Tang recovered the Stone City. In 750 the Tang intervened in a dispute between their vassal Fergana and the neighboring kingdom of Chach, located in modern Tashkent. The kingdom of Chach was sacked and their king was taken back to Chang'an, where he was executed. In the same year Tang also defeated Qieshi in Chitral and the Turgesh.

In 751 Tang forces suffered a major defeat at the Battle of Talas against Abbasid and Karluk forces. Although the Battle of Talas saw the limit of Tang expansion to the west, the importance of the defeat at the Battle of Talas has sometimes been exaggerated. Although the Tang army was defeated, the Arabs did not extend their influence into Xinjiang, and the Karluks remained amiable to the Tang. Some Karluks converted to Islam, but the vast majority did not until the mid 10th century under Sultan Satuq Bughra Khan of the Kara-Khanid Khanate. The long-term strategic importance of Talas was overshadowed later on by the An Lushan Rebellion, which devastated the Tang homeland. It is now understood as the primary cause for the Tang retreat from Central Asia.

In 754 Tang forces defeated Baltistan (Greater Bolü) and Tibetan forces. In 755 the An Lushan Rebellion occurred and the Tang dynasty withdrew 200,000 soldiers from the Western Regions to protect the capital. In 763 the Tibetan Empire conquered Yanqi. In the same year the Tang capital was briefly taken by the Tibetans before they were forced to retreat.

In 764 the Tibetan Empire invaded the Hexi Corridor and conquered Liang Prefecture, cutting off the Anxi and Beiting protectorates from the Tang dynasty. However Anxi and Beiting were left relatively unmolested under the leadership of Guo Xin and Li Yuanzhong.

In 780 Guo Xin and Li Yuanzhong were officially made protectorate generals after sending secret messages to Emperor Dezong of Tang.

In 787 the Tibetan Empire conquered Qiuci.

In 789 the monk Wukong passed through Shule, Yutian, Gumo, Qiuci, Yanqi, and Ting Prefecture and found that they all had Chinese commanders and were free from Tibetan or Uyghur control. This contradicts the previous conquests of Yanqi and Qiuci by the Tibetan Empire in 763 and 787, assertions made by Yuri Bregel in his An Historical Atlas of Central Asia.

In 792 the Tibetan Empire conquered Yutian. It is unclear what happened to Shule (Kashgar), Shache (Yarkand), or Gumo (Aksu). According to O. Pritsak, Kashgar came under Karluk domination around this time, but this is disputed by Christopher I. Beckwith.

Post-Tibetan domination

Of the four garrisons that made up the defunct Anxi Protectorate, all eventually ended up freeing themselves or coming under the dominion of other powers by the mid-9th century. Karasahr and Kucha were occupied by the Kingdom of Qocho in 843. Kashgar came under the dominion of the Kara-Khanid Khanate. The earliest approximate date of around the late 8th or early 9th century is disputed, but it was likely before 980. Khotan regained its independence in 851. By 1006 it was also conquered by the Kara-Khanid Khanate.

List of protector generals
List of grand and assistant protector generals of the Protectorate General to Pacify the West (Anxi):

Protectorate:
Qiao Shiwang (喬師望) 640–642
Guo Xiaoke (郭孝恪) 642–649
Chai Zhewei (柴哲威) 649–651
Qu Zhizhan (麴智湛) 651–658

Grand Protectorate:
Yang Zhou (楊胄) 658–662
Su Haizheng (蘇海政) 662
Gao Xian (高賢) 663
Pilou Shiche (匹婁武徹) 664
Pei Xingjian (裴行儉) 665–667

Protectorate:
Tao Dayou (陶大有) 667–669
Dong Baoliang (董寶亮) 669–671
Yuan Gongyu (袁公瑜) 671–677
Du Huanbao (杜懷寶) 677–679, 
Wang Fangyi (王方翼) 679–681
Du Huanbao (杜懷寶) 681–682
Li Zulong (李祖隆) 683–685

Grand Protectorate:
Wang Shiguo (王世果) 686–687
Yan Wengu (閻溫古) 687–689

Protectorate:
Jiu Bin (咎斌) 689–690
Tang Xiujing (唐休璟) 690–693

Grand Protectorate:
Xu Qinming (許欽明) 693–695
Gongsun Yajing (公孫雅靖) 696–698
Tian Yangming (田揚名) 698–704
Guo Yuanzhen (郭元振) 705–708, 
Zhou Yiti (周以悌) 708–709
Guo Yuanzhen (郭元振) 709–710
Zhang Xuanbiao (張玄表) 710–711
Lu Xuanjing (呂玄璟) 712–716
Guo Qianguan (郭虔瓘) 715–717, 
Li Cong (李琮) 716
Tang Jiahui (湯嘉惠) 717–719, 
Guo Qianguan (郭虔瓘) 720–721
Zhang Xiaosong (張孝嵩) 721–724
Du Xian (杜暹) 724–726
Zhao Yizhen (趙頤貞) 726–728
Xie Zhixin (謝知信) 728
Li Fen (李玢) 727–735
Zhao Hanzhang (趙含章) 728–729
Lu Xiulin (吕休琳) 729–730
Tang Jiahui (湯嘉惠) 730
Lai Yao (萊曜) 730–731
Xu Qinshi (徐欽識) 731–733
Wang Husi (王斛斯) 733–738
Ge Jiayun (蓋嘉運) 738–739
Tian Renwan (田仁琬) 740–741
Fumeng Lingcha (夫蒙靈詧) 741–747
Gao Xianzhi (高仙芝) 747–751
Wang Zhengjian (王正見) 751–752

Protectorate:
Feng Changqing (封常清) 752–755
Liang Zai (梁宰) 755–756
Li Siye (李嗣業) 756–759
Lifei Yuanli (荔非元禮) 759–761
Bai Xiaode (白孝德) 761–762
Sun Zhizhi (孫志直) 762–765
Zhu Mou (朱某) 765–?
Er Zhumou (爾朱某) 765–778
Guo Xin (郭昕) 762–808

Legacy

Physical remains
In Xinjiang and the Chu valley in Central Asia, Tang era Chinese coins continued to be copied and minted after the Chinese left the area. Coins with both Chinese and Karoshthi inscriptions have been found in the southern Tarim Basin.

Linguistic influence
The military dominance of the Tang in Central Asia has been used as an explanation for the Turkic word for China, "Tamghaj", possibly derived from the "House of Tang" (Tangjia) instead of Tabgatch.

Cultural influence
Chinese arts and crafts such as the sancai "three color" glaze left a long lasting impression in Central Asia and Western Eurasia.

In the Persian epic Shahnameh the Chin and Turkestan are regarded as the same. The Khan of Turkestan is called the Khan of Chin.

Aladdin, an Arabic Islamic story which is set in China, may have been referring to Central Asia.

Political influence
Steppe empires often utilized the prestige of the Tang by connecting themselves to the defunct dynasty. The Qara Khitan khans used the title of "Chinese emperor" while the Khara-Khanid khans called themselves Tabgach. Tabgach Khan, or "Khan of China" was a common appellation among Khara-Khanid rulers. Persian, Arab and other western Asian writers came to call China by the name "Tamghaj".

In 1124 the westward migration of the Khitans under Yelü Dashi also consisted of a large population of Han Chinese, Balhae, Jurchen, Mongols, Khitan, in addition to the Xiao consort clan and the Yelü royal family In the 12th century, the Qara Khitai defeated the Kara-Khanid Khanate and conquered their territory in Central Asia. The Khitan rulers, called "the Chinese" by Muslims, governed using Chinese as their official language as well as the Chinese style of imperial government. The effect of their administration was seen with respect and esteem due in part to China's status in Central Asia at the time. The Chinese characteristics appealed to the Muslim Central Asians and helped validate Qara Khitai rule. Han Chinese population among them was comparatively small so it is unlikely that the Chinese characteristics were kept to appease them. Later the Mongols moved more Chinese into Beshbalik, Almaliq and Samarqand in Central Asia to work as artisans and farmers.

The "image of China" played a key role in legitimizing the Khitan rule to the Central Asian Muslims. Prior to the Mongol invasions, the perception of China among Central Asian Muslims was an extremely civilized society, known for its unique script, its expert artisans, justice and religious tolerance. The Chinese, Turk, Arab, Byzantine, and Indian rulers were known as the world's "five great kings". The historical memory of Tang China was powerful enough that anachronistic expressions appeared in Muslim writings long after the end of the Tang. China was known as chīn (چين) in Persian and as ṣīn (صين) in Arabic while the Tang dynasty capital Changan was known as Ḥumdān (خُمدان).

Some Muslim writers like Marwazī, Mahmud Kashghārī and Kashgari viewed Kashgar as part of China. Ṣīn [i.e., China] is originally three fold; Upper, in the east which is called Tawjāch; middle which is Khitāy, lower which is Barkhān in the vicinity of Kashgar. But know Tawjāch is known as Maṣīn and Khitai as Ṣīn" China was called after the Tuoba rulers of the Northern Wei by the Turks, pronounced by them as Tamghāj, Tabghāj, Tafghāj or Tawjāch. India introduced the name Maha Chin (greater China) which influenced the two different names for China in Persian as chīn and māchīn (چين ماچين) and Arabic ṣīn and māṣīn (صين ماصين), Southern China at Guangzhou was known as Chin while Northern China's Chang'an was known as Machin, but the definition switched and the south was referred to as Machin and the north as Chin after the Tang dynasty. As a result of Tang China's control over Kashgar, some Kashghārī placed Kashgar within the definition of China, Ṣīn, whose emperor was titled as Tafghāj or Tamghāj, Yugur (yellow Uighurs or Western Yugur) and Khitai or Qitai were all classified as "China" by Marwazī while he wrote that Ṣīnwas was bordered by placed SNQU and Maṣīn. Machin, Mahachin, Chin, and Sin were all names of China. According to Fakhr al-Dīn Mubārak Shāh, "Turkestan", Balasagun, and Kashghar were identified with where Chīn (China) was located.

Marwazī considered Transoxania to be a former part of China, retaining the legacy of Tang Chinese rule over Transoxania in Muslim writings, In ancient times all the districts of Transoxania had belonged to the kingdom of China [Ṣīn], with the district of Samarqand as its centre. When Islam appeared and God delivered the said district to the Muslims, the Chinese migrated to their [original] centers, but there remained in Samarqand, as a vestige of them, the art of making paper of high quality. And when they migrated to Eastern parts their lands became disjoined and their provinces divided, and there was a king in China and a king in Qitai and a king in Yugur. Some Muslim writers considered the Qara Khitai, the Ganzhou Uighur Kingdom and Kashgar as all parts of "China". After Yusuf Qadir Khan's conquest of new land in Altishahr towards the east, he adopted the title "King of the East and China".

Qocho
The Tang era of Gaochang, later Qocho and Turpan, left a lasting legacy upon the Buddhist Uyghur Kingdom of Qocho. Tang names appear on more than 50 Buddhist temples. Emperor Taizong's edicts were stored in the "Imperial Writings Tower" and Chinese dictionaries like the Jingyun, Yuian, Tang yun, and da zang jing (Buddhist scriptures) were also stored inside the Buddhist temples. Persian monks also maintained a Manichaean temple in the Qocho. The Persian Hudud al-'Alam referred to Qocho as the "Chinese town".

The Turpan Buddhist Uyghurs of the Kingdom of Qocho continued to produce the Chinese Qieyun rime dictionary and developed their own pronunciations of Chinese characters, left over from the Tang influence over the area.

In Central Asia the Uyghurs viewed the Chinese script as "very prestigious" so when they developed the Old Uyghur alphabet, based on the Syriac script, they deliberately wrote it vertically like with Chinese writing.

Modern culture
The Anxi Protectorate is featured in the Jade Dragon expansion for the grand strategy game Crusader Kings II.

Gallery

See also
 Shule Kingdom, Kingdom of Khotan, Kingdom of Qocho, Shanshan
 Protectorate General to Pacify the North
 Protectorate General to Pacify the East
 Protectorate General to Pacify the South 
 Chinese military history
 Horses in East Asian warfare
 Tang dynasty in Inner Asia
 Four Garrisons of Anxi
 Protectorate of the Western Regions
 Administrative divisions of the Tang dynasty
 Beiting Protectorate

References

Citations

Sources

 
 

 Xue, Zongzheng (薛宗正). (1992). Turkic peoples (突厥史). Beijing: 中国社会科学出版社. ; OCLC 28622013

640 establishments
790s disestablishments
Military history of the Tang dynasty
Administrative divisions of ancient China
History of Xinjiang
Chinese Central Asia
States and territories established in the 640s
States and territories disestablished in the 8th century
Emperor Taizong of Tang
Former protectorates